Woolerton is a surname. Notable people with the surname include:

 Caine Woolerton (born 1999), Welsh rugby player
 Doug Woolerton (born 1944), New Zealand politician